The Challenge Accepted is a 1918 American silent drama film directed by Edwin L. Hollywood and starring Zena Keefe, Charles Eldridge and Russell Simpson.

Cast
 Zena Keefe as Sally Haston
 Charles Eldridge as John Haston
 Russell Simpson as Uncle Zeke Sawyer
 Chester Barnett as Steve Carey
 Joel Day as Tom Carey
 Sidney D'Albrook as Billy Murphy
 Jack Hopkins as James Grogan 
 Warren Cook as Captain Roderick Brooke

References

Bibliography
 George A. Katchmer. Eighty Silent Film Stars: Biographies and Filmographies of the Obscure to the Well Known. McFarland, 1991.

External links
 

1918 films
1918 drama films
1910s English-language films
American silent feature films
Silent American drama films
American black-and-white films
Films directed by Edwin L. Hollywood
Films distributed by W. W. Hodkinson Corporation
Pathé Exchange films
1910s American films